The Secret Empire is a fictional organization appearing in American comic books published by Marvel Comics. They first appeared in Tales to Astonish #81 and were created by Stan Lee and Jack Kirby. They were originally a branch of Hydra but later became a separate independent group.

They made their debut in the Marvel Cinematic Universe as a major antagonist in season 2 of Agent Carter. Under this incarnation, they are named the Council of Nine.

Publication history

The Secret Empire first appeared in Tales to Astonish #81 and was created by Stan Lee and Jack Kirby.

Fictional organization history
This subversive organization has been headed by a number of different leaders, always known as "Number One", with each iteration's goals following the desires of its current leader. The Secret Empire was founded by a scientist who felt like an anonymous nobody. The organization began as a criminal enterprise, a subsidiary of HYDRA, which provided it with financial support. The Secret Empire served to distract the attention of authorities, such as S.H.I.E.L.D., from HYDRA's activities, although the original Number One sought to break away from HYDRA. The Secret Empire hired the mercenary Boomerang to steal plans for the Air Force's Orion Missile, but he was defeated by the Hulk. In attempting to blow up the Hulk, Number One instead killed himself.

Some time later, the organization regrouped under a new Number One. This Secret Empire infiltrated Roxxon Oil's Brand Corporation, tried to ruin Captain America's reputation, and kidnapped several mutants—specifically Havok, Polaris, Beast, Iceman, Angel, Mastermind, Mesmero, Blob and Unus the Untouchable—to harness their energy to power a "flying saucer". Number One landed the saucer on the White House lawn, and, after defeating the Empire's "replacement" hero—the first Moonstone—demanded the government surrender control to him or he would detonate nukes in every major American city. The Secret Empire was defeated by Captain America, Cyclops, the Falcon, and Marvel Girl, and Captain America pursued Number One into the White House. Rather than face capture, Number One unmasked himself, then committed suicide. The leader of the Secret Empire was revealed to be a very high U.S. government official attempting a coup d'état.  Although his identity and face are never revealed to the reader, it is strongly implied in the dialogue that Number One was the President of the United States. The government covered up his guilt and suicide with the help of a double. This led to Captain America giving up his role for a while and taking on the role of Nomad. The story was first published in 1973, when the sitting president was Richard Nixon, embroiled at the time in the Watergate scandal. Writer Steve Englehart specifically intended this issue as a metaphor of the Watergate case and the Nixon era.

Later, Professor Power became the new Number One. He sought to trigger a nuclear war between the U.S. and the Soviet Union. The Defenders defeated Professor Power and the Secret Empire, as well as their agents Mad Dog and Mutant Force.

Gabe Jones, agent of S.H.I.E.L.D., is assigned by Nick Fury to infiltrate the group in an attempt to bring it down.

The Secret Empire also sought to eliminate Moon Knight, whom they believed had disrupted some of their operations. The real guilty party was Moon Knight's sidekick Midnight and when Moon Knight and his sidekick confronted the Secret Empire, Midnight was hit by an energy blast from the group's new leader, the mysterious Number 7. Moon Knight abandoned his sidekick, believing that he was dead, but in truth he was still alive, though horrifically disfigured and maimed. Number 7 ordered Midnight transformed into a cyborg, driven by his hatred for Moon Knight (for being abandoned by his mentor) as well as a mechanical failsafe that caused him to suffer intense pain if he disobeyed Number 7.

During the Round Robin story arc in The Amazing Spider-Man, Midnight was sent out on his first mission: kidnap the super-hero Nova so that the Secret Empire could transform him into a cyborg as well. This plan involved the villain Thunderball, who himself was a cybernetics genius. The plan was foiled by the combination of Nova, Spider-Man, Moon Knight, the Punisher, and Night Thrasher. During the battle, the Secret Empire nurse assigned to provide repair work towards Midnight's robotic body parts disabled Number 7's failsafe designed to prevent Midnight from gaining revenge against him for disfiguring/maiming him, allowing Midnight to kill Number 7 and assume control over the Secret Empire. However, along the way it was revealed that his nurse (and now lover), was also a cyborg. A loyal follower of the original founder (the original Number 1), she served as a prototype for the process used to transform Midnight into a half-human, half-machine being that he became, to the extent that she allowed herself to be disfigured and maimed to facilitate her transformation into becoming a cyborg. The realization that his lover was insane caused Midnight to aid his mentor and his allies against the nurse, ultimately sacrificing his life to destroy her.

The Secret Empire would later be part of a conspiracy to divide up the empire of Wilson Fisk, the Kingpin, who had lost control. The meeting took place in Las Vegas, under the cover of a Secret Empire "convention". Many Secret Empire members simply believe it is an organization like the Masons or the Elks, which was a perfect cover for criminal enterprises. The Punisher got wind of this right away and the Empire sent two hit squads to attack him. The first is slain to a man. The second group, a motorcycle gang called the "Praetorians", escape, albeit with heavy casualties. During the Dead Man's Hand crossover, the various warlords who attend the meeting begin attacking each other nearly right away. Mickey Fondozzi and Microchip, associates of the Punisher, had been captured while spying on Strucker and claim to be Four and Eight, members of the Secret Empire. The Empire learn of this via a spy in the HYDRA group. By coincidence, Four and Eight had not actually traveled to Las Vegas and this was enough to convince the others that they had turned traitor. The Empire sends the Praetorians to kill everyone involved, but Mickey, Micro and Strucker all survive. Further encounters led to no progress at all and the Secret Empire members leave Las Vegas on a plane.

The Empire's plans come under the scrutiny of the "Favor Broker", an opponent of Nomad. He teams up with the Punisher and Daredevil in an attempt to disrupt the meeting. All they manage to do is kill some lackeys and Hand ninjas and capture the Slug.

Some time later, agents of the Secret Empire battle the vigilante group known as the Jury. The Secret Empire then becomes involved in a struggle to control profitable shipping lanes for criminal purposes.

It was revealed that the Secret Empire had an underground city beneath Cincinnati when the Secret Avengers discover the Shadow Council in their plot to make a larger version of Doctor Doom's time machine there.

As part of the All-New, All-Different Marvel, the Secret Empire later fights Kate Bishop. A powerless Cassandra Lang tries to help and is nearly killed in the process.

For their first mission, the U.S.Avengers had fought the Secret Empire. During the fight against the Secret Empire, Robert Maverick's Red Hulk form was able to level their volcanic island base.

Membership

Current membership
 Calvin Burlingame - The father of Charcoal.
 Cheer Chadwick - A member of the Elite who has connections with the Secret Empire. She is the daughter of Hesperus Chadwick and the niece of William Taurey.
 Hesperus Chadwick - A member of the Elite who has connections with the Secret Empire. He is the father of Cheer Chadwick and the brother-in-law of William Taurey.
 Richard Cholmondely - 
 Thomas Gloucester - A British nobleman.
 Shocktroopers - 
 William Taurey - A member of the Elite who has connections with the Secret Empire. He is the uncle of Cheer Chadwick and the brother-in-law of Hesperus Chadwick.
 Harcourt Vickers -

Former membership
 Boomerang
 Chainsaw
 Charcoal
 Lynn Church
 Cloud
 Doctor Faustus
 Linda Donaldson
 Mr. Farrell
 Gargantua
 Griffin
 Quentin Harderman - Head of the Committee to Regain America's Principles.
 Harridan
 Javelynn
 Mad-Dog
 Carl Maddicks
 Midnight
 Moonstone
 Bo Ollsen
 Pretorians
 Professor Power
 Quasimodo
 Jay Sanford
 Seraph
 Thunderball
 Trickshot
 Tumbler
 Viper (Jordan Stryke)
 Viper (Madame Hydra)
 Martin Willis
 Wyre
 Zeitgeist

Other members
These members are either honorary or reserve members of the Secret Empire:

 Brute Force
 Fieldstone
 Fizgig
 Hoarfrost
 Hoopsnake
 Ingot
 Loblolly
 Scarum
 Watchfire
 Brotherhood of Mutants
 Blob
 Mastermind
 Unus the Untouchable
 Mutant Force
 Burner
 Lifter
 Peepers
 Shocker
 Slither
 Seekers
 Chain
 Grasp
 Sonic

In other media
 The Secret Empire appeared in the Incredible Hulk segment of The Marvel Super Heroes. In that appearance, they hired Boomerang to take down the Hulk.

 In an interview with Agent Carter executive producers Tara Butters and Michele Fazekas, it was revealed that the Council of Nine is an incarnation of the Secret Empire. Known members include Hugh Jones, Calvin Chadwick, Thomas Gloucester, and Mortimer Hayes, with Vernon Masters as their associate. The Council of Nine first appeared in "A View in the Dark", where Hugh Jones and Thomas Gloucester tell Calvin Chadwick that the Isodyne Program should be shut down after recent events involving the Zero Matter and that Calvin should focus on his senatorial campaign. In the episode "Smoke & Mirrors", it was revealed that the Council of Nine were behind the assassination of William McKinley and Black Tuesday. In the episode "The Atomic Job", Calvin Chadwick gets weary about his wife Whitney Frost's motives and calls up somebody to arrange an emergency meeting with the Council of Nine. In the episode "Life of the Party", the members of the Council of Nine attend a party, where they meet privately in a room which is secretly watched by Dottie Underwood. When Calvin tries to hand Whitney over to the Council of Nine, Whitney absorbs the two men who grabbed her, Calvin Chadwick, Thomas Gloucester, and three other members of the Council of Nine while sparing Hugh Jones, Mortimer Hayes, and two other members. Taking control of the Council of Nine, Whitney tells Hugh Jones to have Vernon Masters brought up to speed, with the Council of Nine being under new management, and then tells Mortimer Hayes to use the newspapers to cover up the disappearances of those she just absorbed. In the episode "Monsters", Whitney Frost speaks at a memorial outside of Anvil Studios stating that Calvin Chadwick, Thomas Gloucester, and those with them had perished in an incident that happened at sea.

References

External links
 Secret Empire at Marvel.com
 Secret Empire at Marvel Wiki

Marvel Comics supervillain teams